Edwin Shepard Chickering (21 September 1912 – 14 February 2003) was a brigadier general in the United States Air Force.

Early life
Chickering was born in Oil City, Pennsylvania on 21 September 1912. He graduated from Lehigh University in 1935 with a degree in engineering.

After graduating, he joined the United States Army Air Corps and attended flight school. He was commissioned a second lieutenant and assigned to Kelly Field in Texas.

World War II

During World War II, Chickering commanded the 357th Fighter Group in England and later commanded the 367th Fighter Group in Europe.

Korean War
During the Korean War Chickering commanded of the 67th Tactical Reconnaissance Wing.

Post-retirement
After retiring from the US Air Force Chickering worked for a Baltimore, Maryland, engineering firm. Upon his death he was buried at Arlington National Cemetery.

Awards and decorations
Chickering was awarded the Legion of Merit, the Distinguished Flying Cross with Oak Leaf Cluster, the Air Medal with seven Oak Leaf Clusters, the Bronze Star, and the French Croix de Guerre with Palm.

References

1912 births
2003 deaths
United States Army personnel of World War II
United States Air Force personnel of the Korean War
Burials at Arlington National Cemetery